Roderick "Rod" Lemonde MacFarquhar (2 December 1930 – 10 February 2019) was a British China scholar, politician, and journalist. 

MacFarquhar had a varied career. He was founding editor of China Quarterly in 1959. He served as a Member of Parliament in the 1970s, then joined the BBC .In the 1980s, he became a professor at Harvard University, where he served several terms as director of the Fairbank Center for Chinese Studies. He was best known for his studies of Maoist China, the three-volume The Origins of the Cultural Revolution and Mao's Last Revolution.

Family and early life
MacFarquhar was born in Lahore, British India (now Pakistan). His father was Sir Alexander MacFarquhar, a member of the Indian Civil Service and later a senior diplomat at the United Nations. His mother was Berenice (née Whitburn). He was educated at the Aitchison College in Lahore and Fettes College, an independent school in Edinburgh.

Academic and journalistic career
After spending part of his national service from 1949 to 1950 in Egypt and Jordan as a second lieutenant in the Royal Tank Regiment, he went up to Keble College, Oxford to read Philosophy, Politics and Economics, obtaining a BA in 1953. He then went on to obtain a master's degree from Harvard University in Far Eastern Regional Studies in 1955, studying with John King Fairbank, who supported his career as a China scholar.

He worked as a journalist on the staff of the Daily Telegraph and Sunday Telegraph from 1955 to 1961 specialising in China, and also reported for BBC television Panorama from 1963 to 1965. He was the founding editor of The China Quarterly from 1959 to 1968, and a non-resident fellow of St Antony's College, Oxford, from 1965 to 1968. In 1969 he was a senior research fellow at Columbia University in New York City, and in 1971 he returned to England to hold a similar fellowship at the Royal Institute of International Affairs. MacFarquhar completed his doctorate at the London School of Economics in 1981.

Political career
In the 1966 general election, MacFarquhar fought the Ealing South constituency for the Labour Party but failed to dislodge the sitting Conservative MP. Two years later, he was Labour candidate who attempted to retain the Meriden seat in a by-election; he was on the wrong end of an 18.4% swing at the height of the Wilson government's unpopularity.

Following the defeat of George Brown in 1970 and favourable boundary changes, MacFarquhar was selected to fight the Belper constituency, and at the February 1974 general election succeeded in winning the seat from its sitting Conservative MP Geoffrey Stewart-Smith. Although he won, there was an estimated swing of 4% to the Conservatives had the same boundaries applied in the previous election.

MacFarquhar proved a moderate figure, in line with Brown's views. He abstained on a vote to remove the disqualification of left-wing Labour councillors in Clay Cross who had broken council housing laws enacted by the previous Conservative government. However, there were exceptions: he also abstained on a vote to increase the Civil list payments on 26 February 1975. He acted as Parliamentary Private Secretary (PPS) to David Ennals, a minister of the state at the Foreign and Commonwealth Office, and retained the job when Ennals was promoted to be Secretary of State for Social Services. He was made a member of the Select Committee on Science and Technology.

After Parliament
In 1978 MacFarquhar resigned his office as PPS after voting against the Government.  In that year, he became a Governor of the School of Oriental and African Studies, a University of London constituent body. The post gave him a job which he could do if he lost his seat. In the 1979 general election, MacFarquhar did indeed lose by 800 votes, and returned to academia and broadcasting (returning to "24 Hours" for a year).

He remained involved in politics and his moderate beliefs made him increasingly uncomfortable in the Labour Party: on 22 October 1981 he announced that he had joined the Social Democratic Party. He fought the South Derbyshire seat, which contained most of then-abolished Belper, for the SDP in the 1983 general election, and nearly succeeded in beating the Labour candidate, although the seat was easily won by the Conservatives.

Subsequent academic career
He was a fellow of the Woodrow Wilson International Center for Scholars in Washington D.C. in 1980-81 and the American Academy of Arts and Sciences since 1986. In 1980–1983, he was a Leverhulme Research Fellow from 1980 until 1983.

In 1986–1992, MacFarquhar was Director of the Fairbank Center for Chinese Studies at Harvard University. He was a Walter Channing Cabot Fellow at Harvard in 1993–1994. He was the Leroy B. Williams Professor of History and Political Science, Emeritus.

He was a scholar of Chinese politics from the founding of the People's Republic through to the Cultural Revolution. Volume three of his study The Origins of the Cultural Revolution: The Coming of the Cataclysm 1961-1966 (1997) won the Joseph Levenson Book Prize for 1999.

In a statistical overview derived from writings by and about Roderick MacFarquhar, OCLC/WorldCat encompasses roughly 140+ works in 330+ publications in 11 languages and 15,700+ library holdings

Personal life
MacFarquhar married Emily Cohen, a journalist and East Asian studies scholar, in 1964. They had two children, the writer Larissa MacFarquhar and economist Rory MacFarquhar, who served as policy adviser in the Obama administration. His first wife died in 2001. He married his second wife, British foreign policy scholar Dalena Wright, in 2012.

MacFarquhar died from heart failure at a hospital in Cambridge, Massachusetts on 10 February 2019, at age 88.

Bibliography

Books
 
 China Under Mao: Politics Takes Command (1963)
 Chinese ambitions and British policy Fabian tract (1966)
 Sino-American Relations: 1949-1971 (1972)
 The Forbidden City (1972)
 The Origins of the Cultural Revolution - 1. Contradictions Among the People, 1956-1957 (1974)
 The Origins of the Cultural Revolution - 2. The Great Leap Forward, 1958-1960 (1983)
 The People's Republic: The Emergence of Revolutionary China, 1949-1965 (1987)
 The Politics of China, 1949-1989 (1993)
 Towards a New World Order (1993)
 The Politics of China: The Eras of Mao and Deng (1997)
 The Origins of the Cultural Revolution - 3. The Coming of the Cataclysm, 1961-1966 (1997)
 The Paradox of China's Post-Mao Reforms (1999)
 Mao's Last Revolution (2006), with Michael Schoenhals, Belknap Press of Harvard University Press, Cambridge, Massachusetts, .
 The Politics of China: Sixty Years of The People's Republic of China (2011)

Book reviews

Notes

References
 Suleski, Ronald Stanley. (2005). The Fairbank Center for East Asian Research at Harvard University: a Fifty Year History, 1955-2005. Cambridge: Harvard University Press. ;  OCLC 64140358

External links 
 Roderick MacFarquhar, journalist and politician who became a China scholar, dies at 88 Washington Post, 12 February 2019 
 Roderick MacFarquhar, Eminent China Scholar, Dies at 88 New York Times, 12 February 2019
 Roderick MacFarquhar obituary The Guardian, 20 February 2019
 
 Home page at Harvard.
 MacFarquhar's reviews for The New York Review of Books.
 Interviewed by Alan Macfarlane  6 April and 16 June 2017 (video)

1930 births
2019 deaths
20th-century British journalists
20th-century British male writers
20th-century British non-fiction writers
21st-century British male writers
21st-century British non-fiction writers
Alumni of Keble College, Oxford
Alumni of the University of London
British expatriate academics in the United States
British sinologists
Harvard University alumni
Harvard University faculty
Labour Party (UK) MPs for English constituencies
Members of the Fabian Society
Panorama (British TV programme)
People associated with SOAS University of London
People educated at Fettes College
People from Lahore
Royal Tank Regiment officers
Social Democratic Party (UK) parliamentary candidates
The Daily Telegraph people
UK MPs 1974
UK MPs 1974–1979
20th-century English businesspeople
Historians of the Cultural Revolution